Große Isar is a river of Bavaria, Germany. It is a branch of the Isar in the city of Landshut.

See also
List of rivers of Bavaria

References 

0Große Isar
Rivers of Bavaria
Rivers of Germany